The NRE 2GS16B-AU is a genset locomotive manufactured by National Railway Equipment Company, Paducah, Kentucky for use in Australia.

History
In 2014, Pacific National took delivery of seven NRE 2GS16Bs to replace its remaining D16 and D35 class locomotives on its BlueScope services in Port Kembla.

Operations
Since the replacing of the very dated D16 and D35 classes, the PB class has been employed to work the steel loading process in Port Kembla Steelworks.

Summary

Trivia
 The PB class features a beacon that spins whenever the loco is moving. 
 They are fitted with 2-tone horns. The low tone sounds similar to a Sydney Trains T set.

References

Pacific National diesel locomotives
Railway locomotives introduced in 2014
NRE locomotives
Standard gauge locomotives of Australia
Bo-Bo locomotives
Diesel-electric locomotives of Australia